Jason Stiles (born June 28, 1973) is a former American football quarterback who played two seasons with the Portland Forest Dragons of the Arena Football League and one season overseas in the German Football League 2. He played college football at Western Washington University. Stiles first enrolled at Santa Margarita Catholic High School in Rancho Santa Margarita, California before transferring to Decatur High School in Federal Way, Washington. Stiles was also a member of the Wolfsburg Blue Wings.

Early years
Stiles first played high school football for the Santa Margarita Catholic High School Eagles. He was the state's leading passer in 1990. He recorded 22 touchdowns on 3,200 passing yards in two years for the Eagles. Stiles earned all-league honors twice and was team captain for two years. He also lettered two years in baseball and basketball. He spent his last two years of high school paying for the Decatur High School Golden Gators, graduating in 1991.

College career
Stiles played college football for the Western Washington Vikings from 1992 to 1995. He recorded career totals of 7,854 passing yards, 1,052 pass attempts, 585 pass completions and 67 touchdown passes. He earned all-Columbia Football Association honors in 1995 and was an NAIA All-America selection. Stiles was also named little all-Northwest three times. He also the Vikings to two appearances in the NAIA playoffs. In 1992, Stiles threw a touchdown pass to wide receiver Chris Moore against the University of Puget Sound which would later win an ESPY for Greatest College Play at the inaugural ESPY awards show.

Professional career

Wolfsburg Blue Wings
Stiles played in ten games for the Wolfsburg Blue Wings in German Football League third tier division during the 1996 season, helping the team to an 8-2 record. He also served as assistant offensive coordinator.

Portland Forest Dragons
Stiles played for the Portland Forest Dragons from 1997 to 1998, recording ten touchdowns passes on 628 yards. He missed the 1999 season due to an injury.

Broadcasting career
Stiles has worked as an analyst for Root Sports Northwest since 2006. He has covered college football, arena football and high school football. He also spent nine years as a color commentator on Western Washington Vikings football radio broadcasts.

References

External links
Just Sports Stats

Living people
1973 births
Players of American football from Washington (state)
American football quarterbacks
Western Washington Vikings football players
Portland Forest Dragons players
American television sports announcers
American radio sports announcers
American color commentators
College football announcers
Arena football announcers
High school football announcers in the United States
People from Federal Way, Washington
American expatriate players of American football
American expatriate sportspeople in Germany